Vijay Gupta was a 15th-century Bengali poet from Barisal. He was part of a revival of Bengali literature in the late 15th century and early 16th century.

Biography
Gupta was born in Agailjhara, Barisal, in the 15th century. His father was Sanatan and his mother was Rukmini.

Gupta is believed to be the second writer (Kana Haridattar is believed to be the first) to write about the goddess Manasa. He wrote poems and epics eulogizing Manasa and spreading her worship in Bengal. He wrote Manashamanga (Padmapuran) about Manasa. The story talks about how a Shiva devotee became her devotee and how Muslims started to worship her so that they could be spared her wrath. The story also spoke about Alauddin Husayn Shah, who ruled from 1494 to 1519, and was an independent Sultan of Bengal. His writings also spoke about trading in Bengal and various ports Bengal traded with.

References

Bengali poets
15th-century writers
15th-century poets
15th-century Bengali poets
People from Barisal District